"Watching the Girls Go By" is an episode of the BBC sitcom, Only Fools and Horses. It was the sixth episode of series 4 and first broadcast on 28 March 1985. In the episode Rodney, egged on by Del, bets Mickey Pearce that he can find a date for an upcoming party and Del decides to help him win the bet.

Synopsis
At The Nag's Head, as Albert plays the piano, Del Boy is beating Boycie easily at a game of cards. As Rodney enters, Mike is handing out tickets for a party that Saturday night. Mickey Pearce believe that Rodney will not be going because he has not got a date. Rodney says that he is bringing a girl who is in show business, and he and Mickey agree to have a bet of "fifty" to prove who is right come Saturday.

Later that night, back at Nelson Mandela House, as the Trotters eat a take-away for dinner, Rodney tells Del and Albert that he lied when he told Mickey that he was bringing a girl. Del and Albert remind Rodney about the other girls he went out with, such as a Southern Areas Shot-put Champion, and a 15-year-old girl who needed an adult with her to get into the cinema.

The next night, Del phones some of his old girlfriends, but none of them are suitable for Rodney. Then, Rodney enters the lounge wearing a white jacket, a black shirt and a stripey tie, as he is hoping to get a girl and win the bet. As Albert goes off to get something, Del tells Rodney how he pictures his vision of love. Albert returns with an old photograph of a German woman named Helga. There is a story behind that photo: it was in 1946, Albert and his fellow shipmates had sailed to Hamburg to pick up some prisoners of war. Albert first met Helga in a pub near the docks, in which Helga was working as a barmaid. According to Albert, Helga was the most beautiful woman he'd ever seen and fell in love with her the moment he saw her. The little finger on Helga's right hand was missing, due to an air-raid bombing on her home, killing her family. When Albert asked Helga to marry her, she said no, because he mistook her gestures of friendship as tokens of love. Although it was for the best, since the authorities did not like their soldiers fraternising with the Germans and Albert was married to his wife Ada at the time. According to Albert, to this day if is ever watching a German war film and hears the word "nein", he always thinks of Helga, because it is the German word for "no". Rodney then decides to give up and pay Mickey Pearce the money, but Del buys the bet off his younger brother for £5 and promises to help get him a date for Saturday night.

Later, the Trotter Brothers arrive at a rather seedy nightclub, where Del gets reacquainted with another old girlfriend named Yvonne, an ex-stripper now turned exotic dancer with a snake. Del tells her about the upcoming party at the Nag's Head. Yvonne is eager to go, but only if she goes with Rodney. Del promises to pay her some of the money from the bet once Mickey Pearce pays up. Yvonne chats up Rodney, who successfully invites her to the Nag's Head party. Now completely confident that he is going to win the bet, Rodney tells Del that he secured a date.

On Saturday night, Del runs all the way back into the flat in a state of panic. Albert follows and warns him that Rodney is coming up the stairs to kill Del. Rodney bursts in and complains to his older brother that Yvonne started stripping after a few drinks because she has a drinking problem. Del reminds his younger brother that he did win his bet. Just as Del hopes that he is going to have £50 in his hands, Rodney hands him a 50p coin, which the bet was really for. Albert comments that he cannot wait to tell his friends that Del paid £5 for a 50p bet and Rodney went on a date with a stripper and in response, Del and Rodney quickly wind Albert up by telling him that Yvonne's snake is the hood of his duffel coat.

Episode cast

References

External links

1985 British television episodes
Only Fools and Horses (series 4) episodes